The  was held on 7 February 1999 in Kannai Hall, Yokohama, Kanagawa, Japan.

Awards
 Best Film: Cure
 Best Actor:
Claude Maki – Orokamono: Kizu Darake no Tenshi
Kiichi Nakai – Love Letter, Begging for Love'
 Best Actress: Mieko Harada – Begging for Love Best Supporting Actor: Ren Osugi – Cure, Hana-bi, Give It All, Orokamono: Kizu Darake no Tenshi, Inu Hashiru Best Supporting Actress: Yumi Yoshiyuki – Murder on D Street, Daikaijū Tōkyō ni arawaru Best Director:
Kiyoshi Kurosawa – CureItsumichi Isomura – Give It All Best New Director: Hideaki Anno – Love & Pop Best Screenplay: Ryoichi Kimizuka – Bayside Shakedown: The Movie Best Cinematography: Yuichi Nagata – Give It All Best New Talent:
Rena Tanaka – Give It AllKumiko Asō – Dr. AkagiAsumi Miwa – Love & Pop Special Jury Prize:
Yoichi Maeda – For focusing on entertainment rather than "serious" movies.Odoru Daisosasen production team

Best 10
 Cure Give It All Hana-bi Orokamono: Kizu Darake no Tenshi Begging for Love Inu Hashiru Love & Pop Ring Bayside Shakedown: The Movie The Bird People in Chinarunner-up. Love Letterrunner-up. Kiriko no Fūkei''

References

Yokohama Film Festival
1999 film festivals
1999 in Japanese cinema
Yoko
February 1999 events in Asia